The 1999 Lagos State gubernatorial election occurred in Nigeria on 9 January 1999. The AD nominee Bola Tinubu won the election defeating the PDP candidate.

Bola Tinubu emerged AD candidate.

Electoral system
The Governor of Lagos State is elected using the plurality voting system.

Primary election

AD primary
The AD primary election was won by Bola Tinubu.

Results
The total number of registered voters in the state was 4,093,143. Total number of votes cast was 1,184,372, while number of valid votes was 1,149,375. Rejected votes were 34,997.

References 

Lagos State gubernatorial elections
Lagos State gubernatorial election
Lagos State gubernatorial election
Lagos